Horseshoe Bay is a major ferry terminal owned and operated by BC Ferries in British Columbia, Canada. Located in the community of Horseshoe Bay, a neighbourhood of West Vancouver, the terminal provides a vehicle ferry link from the Lower Mainland to Vancouver Island, the Sunshine Coast, and to Bowen Island, a small island in the southern part of Howe Sound.

Comprising three berths, Horseshoe Bay is the third largest BC Ferries terminal, after Tsawwassen and Swartz Bay.

Establishment and expansion
In 1951, the Black Ball Line leased a wharf and began a service to Gibsons (later relocated to Langdale). In 1953, a new route to Departure Bay in Nanaimo was established. In 1956, services to Bowen Island began when Black Ball replaced the Union Steamship Company of British Columbia.

In 1961, the provincial government purchased the various Black Ball operations. In the late 1960s, the terminal was reconstructed and expanded. In 1976, a new upper deck loading ramp was built.

In 2002, substantial improvements were completed at a cost of $39 million, which primarily addressed traffic awaiting embarkation on ferries. Holding stalls increased from 650 to 1,265 by absorbing former highway, removing a freeway bridge and truck runaway lane, and reconfiguring a highway interchange. Additional construction included a 450-car underground parkade and new buildings for foot passengers, amenities and maintenance. A $250 million upgrade of the terminal is planned for the 2020s.

On March 28, 2022, the first seismic sensor for British Columbia's earthquake early warning system was installed at the Horseshoe Bay terminal.

Incidents and accidents

 1966: Langdale Queen ran over a nearby rowboat, on which both occupants survived.
 1982: Queen of Surrey rammed the dock causing significant damage.
 1985: Three occupants were killed when Queen of Cowichan ran over a pleasure boat near the terminal.
 1989: A structural steel load on an arriving truck shifted, striking seven parked vehicles and injuring two women in the holding lot.
 1990: After brakes failed, a loaded truck struck a parked van and spilled hot asphalt, killing two of the occupants and injuring others. The truck driver received an 18-month sentence, increased to five years on appeal. At a new trial, the driver was found guilty of dangerous driving but not criminal negligence.
 1991: Robbers stole $12,000 in coin from a safe at the terminal.
 1995: Queen of Coquitlam slammed into pilings, damaging its bow.
 2005: Queen of Oak Bay lost control and smashed into a number of private boats at the marina in Horseshoe Bay; no fatalities were reported.
 2019: A crew member was significantly injured after being hit by the Queen of Cowichan's bow door which was having trouble opening at the terminal.
 2022: A minor rock slide on January 2, 2022 closed the parkade for rock removal and structural repairs. May 19 is the target reopening date.

Gallery

Notes

References

BC Ferries
Transport in Greater Vancouver
Transport in West Vancouver
Ferry terminals in British Columbia